Le Granit (Granite) is a regional county municipality in the Estrie region of eastern Quebec, Canada. Located directly south of Quebec City, it borders the region of Chaudière-Appalaches, as well as the US states of New Hampshire and Maine. It is named for its abundance of granite. Created in 1982, Le Granit's seat is Lac-Mégantic.

Subdivisions
There are 20 subdivisions within the RCM:

Cities & Towns (1)
 Lac-Mégantic

Municipalities (16)
 Audet
 Courcelles
 Frontenac
 Lac-Drolet
 Lambton
 Milan
 Nantes
 Notre-Dame-des-Bois
 Piopolis
 Saint-Ludger
 Saint-Robert-Bellarmin
 Saint-Romain
 Saint-Sébastien
 Sainte-Cécile-de-Whitton
 Stornoway
 Val-Racine

Parishes (1)
 Saint-Augustin-de-Woburn

Townships (2)
 Marston
 Stratford

Demographics

Population
Population trend:

Language
Mother tongue (2016)

Transportation

Access routes
Highways and numbered routes that run through the municipality, including external routes that start or finish at the county border:

 Autoroutes
 None

 Principal highways
 
 

 Secondary highways
 
 
 
 

 External routes

See also
 List of regional county municipalities and equivalent territories in Quebec

References